Jill Elizabeth Bilcock  (born 1948) is an Australian film editor, a member of the Australian Screen Editors (ASE) guild, as well as the American Cinema Editors (ACE) society, and has edited films such as Romeo + Juliet, Moulin Rouge! and Road to Perdition. She occasionally gives seminars at the Victorian College of the Arts in Melbourne, of which she is an alumna.

Bilcock was born in Melbourne, Victoria, Australia. She is a graduate of the Swinburne College of Technology. She won the 2002 Eddie Award (best edited comedy or musical feature film) for Moulin Rouge!, for which she also received a nomination for the Academy Award for Best Film Editing. She has been nominated four times for the BAFTA Award for Best Editing. Three of these nominations were for the first three films directed by Baz Luhrmann: Strictly Ballroom (1992), Romeo + Juliet (1996), and Moulin Rouge! (2002). The fourth BAFTA nomination was for Elizabeth (1998), directed by Shekhar Kapur.

The documentaries Jill Billcock: The Art Of Film Editing for ABC TV and the cinema-released Jill Bilcock: Dancing the Invisible, both in 2017, explore her life and work.

Filmography

Awards and recognition
1996, Won for Best Editing from MovieMaker Readers Awards
2001 – nominated for an Oscar
2002 – Won an American Cinema Editors award
2007 – Won the International Award for Filmmaking Excellence from Australian Film Institute
2012 – Moulin Rouge! was listed as the 32nd best-edited film of all time in a 2012 survey of members of the Motion Picture Editors Guild.
2018 – Companion of the Order of Australia

See also
List of film director and editor collaborations

References

Further reading
 Reporting based on an interview with Bilcock.

External links

1948 births
American Cinema Editors
Australian film editors
Living people
Companions of the Order of Australia
Australian women film editors